Roger Erickson (born December 7, 1964 in Washington D.C.) is an American filmmaker and photographer. He is the first African American to photograph a cover of Vogue magazine featuring Lily Aldridge on the August 2003 cover of Vogue México y Latinoamérica.

History
Roger Erickson was raised in Oakland, California, where he began his tutelage in fine art photography while studying psychology at San Francisco State University.

Career
In November 1990, his first assignment, commissioned for Select Magazine, were photographs of Motörhead, Neil Young and Crazy Horse (written by David Cavanagh, November 1990). In 1991, he relocated to London, where he began his career photographing musicians. In 2003 he became the first African American to photograph a cover of Vogue magazine featuring Lily Aldridge on the August cover of Vogue México y Latinoamérica. In 2017, Roger Erickson photographed his third portfolio issue of Out100 for Out Magazine. His images have been published in Vogue México y Latinoamérica, Harper's Bazaar (UK), ELLE (France), GQ (US), Entertainment Weekly, Out Magazine, Q Magazine, ESPN Magazine, The Source Magazine, Ebony Magazine, and The Advocate.

Over the course of his career, Roger Erickson has photographed many celebrities, musicians and athletes. Among them are Mark Wahlberg, Chris Evans, Eminem, Taraji P. Henson, Juliette Lewis, Jared Leto, Regina King, Billy Bob Thornton, Samuel Jackson, Gillian Anderson, Elizabeth Banks, Kristen Bell, Neil Young, Wanda Sykes, Usher, Chaka Khan, Ozzy Osbourne, Shaun White, Chris Paul, Zang Ziyi, 50 Cent, Ray Liotta, Ian McShane, Edward Albee, Ja Rule, Floyd Mayweather Jr., Greg Louganis, Billie Jean King, Sugar Ray Leonard, Georges St. Pierre, Snoop Dogg, Dr. Dre, J Dilla, Lil' Kim, Joan Jett, Ice Cube, Lena Waithe, Eve (rapper), Outkast and LL Cool J.

Exhibitions
In 2014, Meg Shiffler, Gallery Director of the San Francisco Arts Commission and Galleries, acquired Roger Erickson's photographic series entitled "Outspoken: Portraits of LGBTQ Luminaries" for a four-month solo exhibition in the restored Beaux-Arts architecture San Francisco City Hall Building from June 9 to October 16, 2015. The exhibition coincided with the U.S. Supreme Court decision on the legalization of same sex marriage (Obergefell v. Hodges).

“Determined: The 400-Year Struggle for Black Equality” (Group), Virginia Museum of History & Culture, Richmond, Virginia., June 22, 2019– March 29, 2020

Books
Hip Hop Immortals (contributor) : (2002) Sock Bandit Publishing
Hip Hop Immortals-The Remix (contributor): (2003) Sock Bandit Publishing
More Body and Soul (contributor): (2005) Rizzoli International Publications
Indochine (contributor): (2009) Rizzoli International Publications
 Hip Hop: A Cultural Odyssey (contributor): (2011) Aria Multimedia Entertainment
GOWEST! (profile and Interview): (2011) Daab Publishing
Def Jam Recordings: The First 25 Years of the Last Great Record Label (contributor): (2011) Rizzoli International Publications
Smithsonian Anthology of Hip-Hop and Rap

References

Artist Spotlight: Roger Erickson: The Advocate (LGBT magazine), Author Albert Smith, (August 28, 2010)
"GOWEST!" (profile and Interview): Daab Publishing (2011)
San Francisco Arts Commission and Galleries Exhibition (June 9 to October 16, 2015) 
"Roger Erickson, OUTspoken at San Francisco City Hall": Out Magazine, Author Dennis Hinzmann (May 29, 2015)
"Photographer Roger Erickson Presents ‘OUTspoken: Portraits of LGBTQ Luminaries’": Huffington Post, Author James Michael Nichols (June 6, 2015)
"Pride illuminated in Roger Erickson’s ‘OUTspoken’ photos": San Francisco Examiner, Author Anita Katz (June 18, 2015)
"Illuminating LGBTQ Movers and Shakers": Photo District News Online, Author Amy Wolff (July 21, 2015)
"Still Lives Through J Dilla" and "Photographer, Roger Erickson" Interview: Wax Poetics Magazine Issue No. 41, Japan, (August 15, 2015)

External links
Roger Erickson website
San Francisco Arts Commission and Galleries 
 photographic series by Anita Katz, June 18 2015, SF Examiner
 Queer Voices article by James Michael Nichols, June 7, 2015, Huffington Post
Interview, August 28 2010, The Advocate (LGBT magazine) 
Entertainment article by Kimberly Chun, July 15, 2015, Seattle Post-Intelligencer 
Short Documentary, "I Am...Who Am I..., 2017 IMDb

American photographers
Living people
Artists from Washington, D.C.
1964 births
Fine art photographers